England is obliged by UK law to maintain lists of species and habitats of principal importance for biodiversity conservation; the other countries within the UK: Wales, Scotland and Northern Ireland, have their own laws for this purpose. Public bodies, including local authorities now have a legal duty to have regard to conserving biodiversity in the exercise of their normal functions. In England, this obligation derives from the Natural Environment and Rural Communities (NERC) Act 2006.

Selection
The species that have been designated to be of "principal importance for the purpose of conserving biodiversity" are those that are most threatened, in greatest decline, or where the UK holds a significant proportion of the world's total population. They mainly derive from lists originally drawn up for the UK Biodiversity Action Plan (UK BAP). Similarly the list of habitats of principal importance in England also derive from the UK Biodiversity Action Plan. Both lists were reviewed in 2007, and the total number of UK BAP habitats increased from 45 to 65, and the number of UK BAP species increased from under 600 to 1,150.

From these, the formal list just for England (and laid out below) finally contained 56 of those 65 habitats, and 943 of the original 1,150 UK species.

Legal obligations
Section 40 of The Natural Environment and Rural Communities (NERC) Act 2006 places a legal obligation on public bodies in England to have regard to particular living organisms and types of habitat which are of the greatest conservation importance whilst carrying out their functions, whilst also having a general regard for protecting all biodiversity. Section 41 of that same Act of Parliament requires the Secretary of State to maintain and publish statutory lists of these features - a function carried out on his/her behalf by Defra and Natural England. The lists given here are sometimes known as the 'Section 41 lists', or 'priority habitats' and 'priority species' lists. They replace an earlier list which was required under Section 74 of the CRoW Act of 2000, and which was published by Defra two years later, though their contents were at that time identical to the UK BAP priority habitats and species lists.

Significance
Awareness of the presence of any principal species or principal habitat identified on these lists is of great importance within the local authority planning process when land is considered for development. Along with legally protected species, statutory and non-statutory sites, knowledge of their presence is required if the impact of future development is to be avoided or mitigated. By fully considering all these features in the decision-making process, the planning authority will have demonstrated that it has discharged its duties to conserve biodiversity.

Habitats of 'principal importance' in England
The latest update to the list of Section 41 habitats of principal importance (priority habitats) was published by Natural England in August 2010.

The list shows the broad habitat group, followed by name of the habitat of principal importance (as used by original source).

Arable and horticulture: Arable field margins
Arable and horticulture: Traditional orchards
Boundary: Hedgerows
Coastal: Coastal saltmarsh
Coastal: Coastal sand dunes
Coastal: Coastal vegetated shingle
Coastal: Intertidal mudflats
Coastal: Maritime cliff and slopes
Coastal: Saline lagoons
Freshwater: Aquifer-fed naturally fluctuating water bodies
Freshwater: Eutrophic standing waters
Freshwater: Mesotrophic lakes
Freshwater: Oligotrophic and dystrophic lakes
Freshwater: Ponds
Freshwater: Rivers
Grassland: Lowland calcareous grassland
Grassland: Lowland dry acid grassland
Grassland: Lowland meadows
Grassland: Purple moor-grass and rush pastures 
Grassland: Upland calcareous grassland
Grassland: Upland hay meadows
Heathland: Lowland heathland
Heathland: Mountain heaths and willow scrub
Heathland: Upland heathland
Inland rock: Calaminarian grasslands
Inland rock: Inland rock outcrop and scree habitats
Inland rock: Limestone pavements
Inland rock: Open mosaic habitats on previously developed land
Marine: Blue mussel beds
Marine: Estuarine rocky habitats
Marine: Fragile sponge and anthozoan communities on subtidal rocky habitats
Marine: Horse mussel beds
Marine: Intertidal boulder communities
Marine: Intertidal chalk
Marine: Maërl beds
Marine: Mud habitats in deep water
Marine: Peat and clay exposures
Marine: Sabellaria alveolata reefs
Marine: Sabellaria spinulosa reefs
Marine: Seagrass beds
Marine: Sheltered muddy gravels
Marine: Subtidal chalk
Marine: Subtidal sands and gravels
Marine: Tide-swept channels
Wetland: Blanket bog
Wetland: Coastal and floodplain grazing marsh
Wetland: Lowland fens
Wetland: Lowland raised bog
Wetland: Reedbeds
Wetland: Upland flushes, fens and swamps
Woodland: Lowland beech and yew woodland
Woodland: Lowland mixed deciduous woodland
Woodland: Upland mixed ashwoods
Woodland: Upland oakwood
Woodland: Wet woodland
Woodland: Wood-pasture and parkland

Species of 'principal importance' in England
The latest update to the Section 41 list of species of principal importance for the conservation of biodiversity in England (priority species) was published by Natural England in May 2014. It now includes 943 species.

See also
List of United Kingdom Biodiversity Action Plan species
List of habitats of principal importance in Wales

References

Species of principal importance in England
United Kingdom environment-related lists
United Kingdom nature-related lists
Endangered biota of Europe
Flora of England
Conservation in England
Conservation in the United Kingdom
Biota of England
England-related lists